

Sovereign states

A
Abkhazia – Principality of Abkhazia
 Aceh – Sultanate of Aceh
 Andorra – Principality of Andorra
Ahom – Ahom Kingdom
Arakkal – Kingdom of Cannanore
 Avar – Avar Khanate
 Ayutthaya – Ayutthaya Kingdom

B
Bajhang
Bastar – Bastar State
 – Benin Empire
 – Kingdom of Bhutan
 – Bono state
 – Sultanate of Brunei
 Bukhara – Khanate of Bukhara
Burma – Burmese Empire

C
Calicut – Zamorin of Calicut
 Cambodia – Kingdom of Cambodia
 – Kingdom of Cayor
 – Great Qing Empire
Chamba – Chamba State
Champa – Kingdom of Champa
Chitradurga – Chitradurga Nayak Kingdom
Chutiya – Chutiya Kingdom
Circassia
Cochin – Kingdom of Cochin
Cooch Behar – Cooch Behar State
 Cospaia – Republic of Cospaia

D
Đại Việt – Kingdom of Đại Việt
 – Dendi Kingdom
 Denmark-Norway – United Kingdoms of Denmark and Norway
Dhenkanal – Dhenkanal State
Dremoshong – Kingdom of Dremoshong
Durdzuki
Dzungar – Dzungar Khanate

E
 England – Kingdom of England (in personal union with Scotland)
 – Ethiopian Empire

F
 – Kingdom of France

G
Garhwal – Garhwal Kingdom
 – Kingdom of Garo
Gazikumukh – Gazikumukh Khanate
 – Republic of Genoa
Gingee – Gingee Nayak Kingdom
Gorkha – Gorkha Kingdom

H
Hawwara 
 – Holy Roman Empire of the German Nation
 Austria – Archduchy of Austria
 Bavaria – Electorate of Bavaria
 Brandenburg – Margraviate of Brandenburg (in personal union with Prussia)
 Cologne – Electorate of Cologne
 Electoral Palatinate – County Palatine of the Rhine
 Lorraine – Duchy of Lorraine
 Mainz – Electorate of Mainz
 Saxony – Electorate of Saxony
 Trier – Electorate of Trier
 Württemberg – Duchy of Württemberg

I
 – Ijebu Kingdom
 Iran – Expansive Realm of Iran
 Ireland – Irish Catholic Confederation

J
Jaintia – Jaintia Kingdom 
 – Kingdom of Janjero
 – Tokugawa shogunate
 – Sultanate of Johor
 – Kingdom of Jolof
Jumla

K
Kabardia – Principality of Kabardia
Kachar – Kachari Kingdom
 – Kingdom of Kaffa
Kalahandi – Kalahandi State
 Kalmyk – Kalmyk Khanate
  Kangleipak – Kangleipak State
Kangra – Kangra State
Kandy – Kingdom of Kandy
Kanker – Kanker State
Kazakh – Kazakh Khanate
Keladi – Keladi Nayak Kingdom
Keonjhar – Keonjhar State
 – Khanate of Khiva
Khoshut – Khoshut Khanate
 Kongo – Kingdom of Kongo
 Korea – Kingdom of Joseon
 – Kingdom of Koya
 – Kuba Kingdom
Kumaon – Kumaon Kingdom

L
Lan Na – Lan Na Kingdom
Lo – Kingdom of Lo
 Lucca – Republic of Lucca

M
Madurai – Madurai Nayak dynasty
 Malta – Order of Saint John 
 Mantua – Duchy of Mantua
Massa – Principality of Massa
 Masserano – Principality of Masserano
Mayurbhanj – Mayurbhanj State
 Modena – Duchy of Modena and Reggio
 Monaco – Principality of Monaco
 Montferrat – Duchy of Montferrat
 – Sultanate of Morocco
 Mrauk U – Kingdom of Mrauk U
 Mughal Empire
 Mysore – Kingdom of Mysore

N
Ndongo – Kingdom of Ndongo
Nepal – Malla dynasty of Nepal 
 Netherlands – Republic of the Seven United Netherlands
Ngoyo – Kingdom of Ngoyo
 Noli – Republic of Noli

O
Odanad
 Oman – Imamate of Oman
Ossetia
 Ottoman Empire – Sublime Ottoman State
 Oyo – Oyo Empire

P
 – State of the Church
 Parma – Duchy of Parma
Patna – Patna State
Piombino – Principality of Piombino
 Poland–Lithuania – Polish–Lithuanian Commonwealth
 Portugal – Kingdom of Portugal
 Prussia – Duchy of Prussia (in personal union with Brandenburg)

R
 Ragusa – Republic of Ragusa
 Russia – Tsardom of Russia
 Ryukyu – Ryukyu Kingdom

S
 – Republic of San Marino
 Savoy – Duchy of Savoy 
 Scotland – Kingdom of Scotland (in personal union with England)
 Seborga – Principality of Seborga
 Senarica – Republic of Senarica
 – Funj sultanate of Sinnar
Sonepur – Sonepur State
Southern Ming – Great Ming Empire
 Spain – Monarchy of Spain
Suket – Suket State
 Sulu – Sultanate of Sulu
 Sweden – Swedish Empire
Switzerland – Swiss Confederacy

T
Tarki – Shamkhalate of Tarki
Thanjavur – Thanjavur Nayak Kingdom
 Torriglia – Marquisate of Torriglia
 Tuscany – Grand Duchy of Tuscany
Twipra – Twipra Kingdom

U

V
Venad
 Venice – Most Serene Republic of Venice

W

Y
Yarkent – Yarkent Khanate
 Yemen – Zaidi Imamate

Non-sovereign territories

England
 English America

Notes

1648